Gangkhar Puensum (alternatively, Gangkar Punsum or Gankar Punzum) is the highest mountain in Bhutan and the highest unclimbed mountain in the world, with an elevation of  and a prominence of . Its name means "White Peak of the Three Spiritual Brothers" in Dzongkha.

Gangkhar Puensum lies on the border between Bhutan and Tibet. After Bhutan was opened for mountaineering in 1983 there were four expeditions that resulted in failed summit attempts in 1985 and 1986.

Since 2003, mountaineering has been banned in Bhutan.

History

The elevation of Gangkhar Puensum was first measured in 1922 but, until recent years, maps of the region were not at all accurate and the mountain was shown in different locations and with markedly different heights. Indeed, because of inadequate mapping, the first team to attempt the summit was unable to find the mountain at all.

Kula Kangri, 7,554 metres, is a separate mountain  to the northeast which was first climbed in 1986. It is variously mapped and described as being in Tibet or Bhutan.

Since 1994, climbing of mountains in Bhutan higher than  has been prohibited out of respect for local spiritual beliefs. Since 2003, mountaineering has been forbidden completely.

In 1998 a Japanese expedition secured permission from the Chinese Mountaineering Association to climb the mountain, but permission was withdrawn because of a political issue with Bhutan. Instead, in 1999, the team set off from Tibet and successfully climbed the 7,535-metre subsidiary peak Liankang Kangri (also known as Gangkhar Puensum North).

Unlike most maps, the expedition's report shows this summit as being in Tibet and the China–Bhutan border is shown crossing the summit of Gangkhar Puensum, described as "the highest peak in Bhutan", at 7,570 metres.

As the ban is unlikely to be lifted anytime soon, Gangkhar Puensum is likely to remain unclimbed.

See also
Mountains of Bhutan
List of elevation extremes by country

References

Further reading
 Footnote included on the Peaklist page
 Kangkar Punsum and Kula Kangri
 Nirvana Expeditions photograph of the mountain (visual site, flora and fauna).

Mountains of Bhutan
Mountains of Tibet
Bhutan–China border
International mountains of Asia
Seven-thousanders of the Himalayas
Highest points of countries